Kammapatti is a village in the Virudhunagar district in India.

Villages in Thoothukudi district